Pauline Cassin Caro (Cassin; pen name, P. Albane; 1828/34/35 – 28 January 1901, Paris) was a French Catholic novelist. She wrote under her own name and using the pseudonym, "P. Albane". Caro died in 1901.

Biography
Pauline Cassin was born in 1828/34/35. Her father was a functionary in the university and while still young, he died from a typhoid epidemic. A brother and sister died within a few months thereafter. Long afterwards, her only child, a daughter, died at the age of 23. Then Mrs. Caro's mother died, and finally her husband, Elme Marie Caro (1887), who had been a member of the Académie Française, leaving the widow alone in the world.

She wrote four novels under a fictitious name: Le Peche de Madeleine, Flamen, Histoire de Souci, and Les Nouvelles Amours d'Hermann et de Dorothee. Fifteen years afterwards, she resumed her writing and published, Amour de Jeune Fille, Complice!, Fausse Route, Fruits Amers, L'Idole, Les Lendemains.

She died in Paris, 28 January 1901.

Selected works
 Le Péché de Madeleine, 1865
 Flamen, 1866
 Histoire de Souci, 1868
 Les Nouvelles Amours d'Hermann et de Dorothee, 1872
 Amour de Jeune Fille, 1892
 Complice!, 1893
 La Fausse Route, 1890
 Fruits Amers, 1892
 L'Idole, 1894
 Les Lendemains, 1895
 Idylle nuptiale, 1897
 Pas à pas, 1898
 Aimer c'est vaincre: roman illustré de 42 dessins d'apès ..., 1904

Notes

References

1828 births
1901 deaths
19th-century French novelists
French women novelists
19th-century pseudonymous writers
Pseudonymous women writers
French Roman Catholic writers